Nicewood Park is a seven-acre park located in Newport News, Virginia and maintained by the Newport News Department of Parks, Recreation and Tourism.

Nicewood Park is located at the end of Nicewood Drive in Newport News.  The park has a large grassy field, a basketball hoop, trash cans,  swings, two slides, picnic tables, and many trees.  The terrain is mostly flat, although to the right of the park's main entrance it becomes slightly hilly.  To the right of the park is a stream which feeds into a sewer.  If one is lucky, one may hear or see ducks, birds such as northern cardinals, and butterflies.    The park is in a residential area and closes at sunset.

References

Virginia municipal and county parks
Parks in Newport News, Virginia